Shelter is a 2014 American drama film written and directed by Paul Bettany in his directorial debut. The film stars Jennifer Connelly and Anthony Mackie, alongside a supporting cast featuring Rob Morgan, Amy Hargreaves, and Bruce Altman. It was released on November 13, 2015, by Screen Media Films.

Plot
Tahir, an Illegal immigrant from Nigeria, and Hannah, a heroin addict, live homeless on the streets of Manhattan.  Tahir, a devout Muslim who is polite to everyone he meets, survives by performing music in city parks, while Hannah lies, steals and sells her body to get her next fix.  When Tahir saves Hannah from a suicide attempt, the two form a friendship.  Over the year that follows, they share their pasts, and their friendship turns to love. Their circumstances begin to improve, but Tahir falls ill and eventually "joins" his wife and child who died in Nigeria. His love for Hannah helps her overcome her addiction and return to her son in California.

Cast
 Jennifer Connelly as Hannah
 Anthony Mackie as Tahir
 Rob Morgan as Franklin
 Amy Hargreaves as Carrie
 Bruce Altman as Peter
 Kevin Geer as Walter
 Alok Tewari as Abdul
 Scott Johnsen as Terry
 Babs Olusanmokun as Hospital Security Guard

Production
On August 21, 2013, it was announced Paul Bettany would direct the film.

Release
The film premiered at the Toronto International Film Festival on September 12, 2014. On January 14, 2015, Screen Media Films acquired distribution rights to the film and released it on November 13, 2015.

Reception
Shelter has received generally mixed reviews from critics. On Rotten Tomatoes, the film has a rating of 46%, based on 24 reviews, with an average score of 5.6/10. On Metacritic, the film has a score of 43 out of 100, based on 11 critics, indicating "mixed or average reviews".

References

External links
 
 

2014 films
2010s English-language films
2014 drama films
American drama films
American independent films
Films about homelessness
Films about interracial romance
2014 directorial debut films
2014 independent films
2010s American films